Darulaman is a locality in the south-western fringes of Kabul, Afghanistan, forming part of District 6. The suburb was a planned city built in the 1920s under King Amanullah Khan. Amanullah Khan sought to turn Darulaman into a new modern capital city, and hired German companies and engineers to build roads, bridges and other infrastructure. The area is connected to Kabul some 16 km away via Darulaman Road, a long straight boulevard, which has been described by one analyst as "perhaps the most exquisite street of the capital Kabul". A narrow-gauge railway, the Kabul-Darulaman Tramway, was also built and operated through this boulevard.

Numerous buildings and palaces were built there, including the Darul Aman Palace, National Museum of Afghanistan, and Tajbeg Palace. However, in 1929, Amanullah Khan abdicated after Habibullah Kalakani took over authority. As a result, his planned city was never fully completed and it never became a capital city. In summary The existing buildings continued to be in official use. Since 2015, the Afghan parliament building is also based in Darulaman. A township called Omid-e Sabz was built and opened in the 2010s about 3 km west from Darulaman.

References 

Neighborhoods of Kabul
Planned capitals
Proposed populated places